Sir William George Perring (17 March 1866 – 24 August 1937) was a British Conservative politician.

A member of Paddington Borough Council, he served as mayor of Paddington from 1911 to 1912.  He was first elected to the House of Commons at the 1918 general election as Member of Parliament (MP) for Paddington North, when he stood as a Coalition Conservative (a holder of the "coalition coupon" issued to supporters of the coalition government led by David Lloyd George"). He was re-elected at the next three elections, and retired from the House of Commons at the 1929 general election.

Perring laid the foundation stone for the Porchester Centre in Bayswater in 1923, and opened the building in 1925. He also bequeathed a sculpture,  The Reading Girl, which remains part of the entrance hall in this Grade II* listed building.

He died on 24 August 1937, aged 71.

References

External links 
 

1866 births
1937 deaths
Conservative Party (UK) MPs for English constituencies
UK MPs 1918–1922
UK MPs 1922–1923
UK MPs 1923–1924
UK MPs 1924–1929
Members of Paddington Metropolitan Borough Council
Mayors of places in Greater London